Charlie Stukes (born September 13, 1943), is a former professional American football defensive back. He started in Super Bowl V for the Baltimore Colts.  He previously worked as an Assistant Principal at Oscar Smith High School in Chesapeake, Virginia.  He currently works at the same school as an administrative assistant.

References

1943 births
Living people
Sportspeople from Chesapeake, Virginia
Players of American football from Virginia
American football cornerbacks
Maryland Eastern Shore Hawks football players
Baltimore Colts players
Los Angeles Rams players